SS Sarah J. Hale was a Liberty ship built in the United States during World War II. She was named after Sarah J. Hale, the author of the nursery rhyme "Mary Had a Little Lamb", she campaigned for the creation of the American holiday known as Thanksgiving and for the completion of the Bunker Hill Monument, editor of Ladies' Magazine, and founder of the Seaman's Aid Society in 1833, to assist the surviving families of Boston sailors who died at sea.

Construction
Sarah J. Hale was laid down on 29 September 1943, under a Maritime Commission (MARCOM) contract, MC hull 1538, by J.A. Jones Construction, Panama City, Florida; she was launched on 24 November 1943.

History
She was allocated to International Freighting Corporation, on 31 December 1943. She was one of eight special ships, a Z-EC2-S-C2, a Tank carrier. She was built with larger cargo hold hatches and stronger crane lifts. J.A.Jones Construction built the eight Z-EC2-S-C2 Tank carrier in 1943.  On 1 October 1945, she was laid up in the National Defense Reserve Fleet, in the James River Group, Lee Hall, Virginia. On 31 July 1972, she was sold for $77,100 to N.V. Intershitra, Rotterdam, for scrapping. She was removed from the fleet on 25 August 1972.

References

Bibliography

 
 
 
 
 

 

Liberty ships
Ships built in Panama City, Florida
1943 ships
James River Reserve Fleet